The Dancing Town is a 1928 two-reeler film. It was Humphrey Bogart's film debut.

Film preservation 
The film survives at the UCLA Film and Television Archive.

References

1928 films
Paramount Pictures short films
American black-and-white films
American silent short films
Films with screenplays by Rupert Hughes
1920s English-language films
1920s American films